The 2016 Deutscher Tourenwagen Cup is the twenty-second season of the Deutscher Tourenwagen Cup, the German championship for touring cars, and the first under its current name after dropping the ADAC name. For this season a new category - Superproduction - was introduced, replacing Division 1, while Divisions 2 and 3 were reclassified as Production 1 and Production 2 respectively. Despite not using the ADAC name the series will support ADAC GT Masters and its support series. The calendar consists of eight separate race weekends with two races each, spread over eight different tracks.

Teams and drivers
Dunlop is the official tyre supplier.

Race calendar and results

Championship standings

Drivers' Championship

 Additionally 1 points is given for pole and 1 point for fastest lap

References

External links
 Official Deutscher Tourenwagen Cup website

Deutscher Tourenwagen Cup